The following lists events that happened during 2005 in the Republic of Kazakhstan.

Incumbents
President: Nursultan Nazarbayev
Prime Minister: Daniyal Akhmetov

Events

November
 November 9 – Venus Express lifts off from the Baikonur Cosmodrome.
 November 11 – oppositionist Zamanbek Nurkadilov is found dead in his apartment in Almaty.

December
 December 4 – Exit polls indicated that incumbent leader Nursultan Nazarbayev won the presidential election by a landslide.

References

 
2000s in Kazakhstan
Years of the 21st century in Kazakhstan
Kazakhstan
Kazakhstan
Kazakhstan